Uzunçayır is a station on the Istanbul Metrobus Bus rapid transit line. It is located on the Istanbul Inner Beltway, within the Uzunçayır interchange. The station is serviced by four of the seven Metrobus routes. Connection to the M4 line of the Istanbul Metro is available.

Uzunçayır station was opened on 3 March 2009 as part of the eastward expansion of the line across the Bosporus.

References

External links
Uzunçayır station
Uzunçayır in Google Street View

Istanbul Metrobus stations
2009 establishments in Turkey
Üsküdar